Jan Paweł Falkowski  (26 June 191227 July 2001) was a Polish fighter ace of the Polish Air Force in World War II with 9 confirmed kills.

Biography
Falkowski was born in Pohulanka near Vilnius in 1912. In 1934 he entered to Polish Air Force Academy in Dęblin. He was promoted first lieutenant (podporucznik) in October 1936. Then he began his career in Toruń. In 1938 he was sent to Dęblin as instructor. During the Invasion of Poland, on 3 September 1939, he flew a PWS-26, three German planes attacked him. Falkowski reduced the flight almost to the ground and using aircraft maneuverability caused that one German fighter crashed into the ground, and the other interrupted the attack and turned back, most likely due to the small amount of fuel.

After the Soviet invasion of Poland he crossed the border with Romania, then he came to France where he became instructor at Polish School in Lyon–Bron Airport. On 31 May 1940 he took command of section no. 10. When France capitulated, he arrived in the United Kingdom on 27 June 1940. He was assigned to No. 32 Squadron RAF. He shot down his first plane on 16 January 1941. During the battle, his plane was badly damaged, Falkowski had to jump with a parachute and broke his leg on landing. After treatment he was sent to the No. 315 Polish Fighter Squadron. In August 1941 he downed three Bf 109 over France. In September he scored two victories. On 22 September he became commander of "A" Flight. He also served in No. 316 Polish Fighter Squadron and No. 303 Polish Fighter Squadron.
On 30 January 1945 he was named commander of the 3rd Polish Fighter Wing. During one flight over the Netherlands, on 9 March 1945, he was hit by flak, due to the failure of the aircraft, Falkowski had to save himself by jumping with a parachute once again. He was fired upon by the Germans. One of the bullets wounded him in the leg. He was taken POW. On 9 May 1945 he came back to England.

After the demobilization in 1947, he settled in Canada and had a farm 20 miles away from Toronto. In the 1960s he wrote an autobiographic book, Z wiatrem w twarz (With the wind in my face), edited in Poland in 1990.

Jan Falkowski died on 27 July 2001 in Peterborough, Canada.

Awards
 Virtuti Militari, Silver Cross 
 Cross of Valour (Poland), four times
 Distinguished Flying Cross (United Kingdom)

References

Bibliography
 Bartłomiej Belcarz: Grupa Myśliwska Montpellier 1940. Sandomierz: Wydawnictwo Stratus, 2012  
 Tadeusz Jerzy Krzystek, Anna Krzystek: Polskie Siły Powietrzne w Wielkiej Brytanii w latach 1940-1947 łącznie z Pomocniczą Lotniczą Służbą Kobiet (PLSK-WAAF). Sandomierz: Stratus, 2012, p. 174. 
 Jerzy Pawlak: Absolwenci Szkoły Orląt: 1925-1939. Warszawa: Retro-Art, 2009, p. 153. 
 Piotr Sikora: Asy polskiego lotnictwa. Warszawa: Oficyna Wydawnicza Alma-Press. 2014, pp. 223–228. 
 Józef Zieliński: Asy polskiego lotnictwa. Warszawa: Agencja lotnicza ALTAIR, 1994, p. 27. ISBN 83862172. 
 Józef Zieliński: Lotnicy polscy w Bitwie o Wielką Brytanię. Warszawa: Oficyna Wydawnicza MH, 2005, pp. 44–45.

Further reading

 Wojciech Zmyślony Jan Falkowski w portalu Polskie Siły Powietrzne w II wojnie światowej 
 

 Biografia w polishairforce.pl
 

The Few
Recipients of the Distinguished Flying Cross (United Kingdom)
Polish World War II flying aces
Recipients of the Silver Cross of the Virtuti Militari
Recipients of the Cross of Valour (Poland)
2001 deaths
1912 births
Polish prisoners of war
World War II prisoners of war held by Germany